Prunus subg. Prunus is a subgenus of Prunus. This subgenus includes plums, apricots and bush cherries. Most species inside this subgenus bear fruit that is sugary, storing large amounts of energy, which is why most Prunus species' fruits are soft and rubbery. Some species conventionally included in Prunus subg. Amygdalus are clustered with plum/apricot species according to molecular phylogenetic studies. Shi et al. (2013) has incorporated subg. Amygdalus into subg. Prunus, thereby including almonds and peaches in this subgenus.

Sections according to Shi et al. (2013) 
Shi et al. (2013) divide subg. Prunus into seven sections: sect. Amygdalus, sect. Armeniaca, sect. Emplectocladus, sect. Microcerasus, sect. Persicae, sect. Prunocerasus and sect. Prunus. They form three clades. The basal clade is sect. Emplectocladus which is sometimes treated as a subgenus. The other two clades are the Amygdalus-Persicae clade (sometimes treated as subg. Amygdalus) and the Armeniaca-Microcerasus-Prunocerasus-Prunus clade (subg. Prunus in a narrow sense).

Sect. Emplectocladus 
Prunus sect. Emplectocladus (Torr.) A.Gray is the sister group to all the other species in this subgenus, and sometimes treated as a distinct subgenus, Prunus subg. Emplectocladus (Torr.) S.C.Mason. It includes six New World species.
 Prunus fasciculata – desert almond
 Prunus cercocarpifolia
 Prunus eremophila – Mojave Desert almond
 Prunus havardii – Havard's wild almond
 Prunus microphylla – Mexican wild almond
 Prunus minutiflora – Texas wild almond

Sect. Amygdalus & Sect. Persica 
Prunus sect. Amygdalus (L.) Benth. & Hook.f. and Prunus sect. Persica (Mill.) Nakai sometimes constitute Prunus subg. Amygdalus (L.) Focke. They form a monophyletic clade together, but the boundary between them seems not very distinct. A few species, such as P. spinosissima (thorny almond) and P. kansuensis (Gansu peach), are clustered in either sect. Amygdalus or sect. Persica in different studies.  The word "ămygdălus" is Latin for the almond nut.

Sect. Amygdalus includes most Old World almond species except P. mongolica, P. tangutica, P. triloba, P. pedunculata, P. tenella, P. petunnikowii and probably other related species.

Selected species:
 Prunus arabica – Arabian wild almond
 Prunus dulcis – almond
 Prunus fenzliana
Prunus spinosissima – thorny almond

Sect. Persica includes peach species as well as two species previously considered almonds (P. mongolica and P. tangutica).
 Prunus davidiana – Chinese peach
 Prunus ferganensis – Fergana peach
 Prunus kansuensis – Gansu peach
 Prunus mira – Tibetan peach
 Prunus mongolica – Mongolian almond
 Prunus persica – peach
 Prunus tangutica – Tangut almond

Sect. Armeniaca 

Species in this Prunus sect. Armeniaca (Scop.) Koch are apricots, native to Eurasia.

Selected species:
 Prunus armeniaca – apricot
 Prunus mandshurica – Manchurian apricot
 Prunus mume – Japanese apricot
 Prunus sibirica – Siberian apricot

Sect. Microcerasus 

Species in Prunus sect. Microcerasus (Spach) C.K.Schneid. are known as bush cherries or dwarf cherries.

Selected species:
 Prunus glandulosa
 Prunus japonica
 Prunus prostrata
 Prunus pumila
 Prunus tianshanica

Sect. Prunocerasus 

Prunus sect. Prunocerasus Koehne includes New World plums and peachbush (P. texana).

Selected species:
 Prunus americana – American plum
 Prunus angustifolia – sand plum
 Prunus maritima – beach plum
 Prunus mexicana – Mexican plum
 Prunus nigra – Canada plum
 Prunus texana – peachbush

Sect. Prunus 

Prunus sect. Prunus includes Old World plums.

Selected species:
 Prunus cerasifera – cherry plum
 Prunus domestica – European plum
 Prunus salicina – Chinese plum
 Prunus simonii – apricot plum
 Prunus spinosa – sloe

Additional sections 
Species of the following sections were not presented in the results of Shi et al. (2013). Therefore, their relationship with the sections proposed by Shi et al. (2013) is unclear.

Sect. Chamaeamygdalus 
Prunus sect. Chamaeamygdalus Spach used to be included in the Amygdalus-Persica clade. However, molecular phylogenetic research indicates that it should be excluded from the Amygdalus-Persica clade. The phylogenetic positions of the species in this section are still uncertain.
 Prunus tenella – Russian almond
 Prunus petunnikowii

Sect. Louiseania 
Prunus sect. Louiseania (Carrière) Yazbek includes two or three Asian species. Although they are called flowering almond, they are more closely related to apricots and bush cherries.
 Prunus pedunculata
 Prunus triloba
 Prunus tomentosa
 Prunus ulmifolia (It has not been confirmed by molecular studies whether this species belongs to this section.)

Sect. Penarmeniaca 
Prunus sect. Penarmeniaca S.C.Mason is the sister group to New World plums, P. texana and probably the Old World species P. tenella. It includes two New World species.
 Prunus andersonii – desert peach
 Prunus fremontii – desert apricot

Notes

References 

Plant subgenera
Prunus